The Samuel I. and Olena J. Goodwin House at 80 West 400 North in Lehi, Utah, United States, was built in 1907.  It was listed on the National Register of Historic Places in 1998.

References

Neoclassical architecture in Utah
Houses completed in 1907
Houses in Utah County, Utah
Houses on the National Register of Historic Places in Utah
Victorian architecture in Utah
Buildings and structures in Lehi, Utah
National Register of Historic Places in Utah County, Utah